Carbon County is a county located in the U.S. state of Montana. As of the 2020 census, the population was 10,473. Its county seat is Red Lodge.

Carbon County is part of the Billings, MT Metropolitan Statistical Area.

History
Carbon County was named for the rich coal deposits found in the area. It was organized on March 4, 1895, from portions of Park and Yellowstone counties.

Land from Park and Yellowstone counties was used to form Carbon County on March 4, 1895. More than sixty federally designated historic sites are located in the county, including Petroglyph Canyon, one of the state's most important rock art sites.

The first commercial oil well in the state was established in Elk Basin fields in 1915.

Geography

Granite Peak, the state's highest mountain, is found in Carbon County's Beartooth Mountains. The Beartooth Highway, one of the "most spectacular alpine highways", links Red Lodge to Cooke City. The Pryor Mountains are in the east of the county, along with the Big Horn River.

Major highways

  U.S. Highway 212
  U.S. Highway 310
  Montana Highway 72
  Montana Highway 78

Adjacent counties

 Park County - west
 Stillwater County - north
 Yellowstone County - northeast
 Big Horn County - east
 Big Horn County, Wyoming - southeast
 Park County, Wyoming - south

National protected areas
 Bighorn Canyon National Recreation Area (part)
 Custer National Forest (part)
 Gallatin National Forest (part)

Politics
Carbon County has voted Republican in every presidential election since 1968.

Demographics

2000 census
As of the 2000 United States census, there were 9,552 people, 4,065 households, and 2,707 families living in the county. The population density was 5 people per square mile (2/km2). There were 5,494 housing units at an average density of 3 per square mile (1/km2). The racial makeup of the county was 97.07% White, 0.25% Black or African American, 0.68% Native American, 0.36% Asian, 0.65% from other races, and 0.99% from two or more races. 1.77% of the population were Hispanic or Latino of any race. 28.8% were of German, 11.5% English, 9.2% Irish, 8.9% Norwegian, 5.9% American and 5.2% Italian ancestry.

There were 4,065 households, out of which 28.40% had children under the age of 18 living with them, 56.70% were married couples living together, 6.70% had a female householder with no husband present, and 33.40% were non-families. 28.80% of all households were made up of individuals, and 12.10% had someone living alone who was 65 years of age or older. The average household size was 2.32 and the average family size was 2.86.

The county population contained 24.00% under the age of 18, 5.70% from 18 to 24, 26.10% from 25 to 44, 27.30% from 45 to 64, and 16.80% who were 65 years of age or older. The median age was 42 years. For every 100 females, there were 100.40 males. For every 100 females age 18 and over, there were 97.30 males.

The median income for a household in the county was $32,139, and the median income for a family was $38,405. Males had a median income of $30,226 versus $19,945 for females. The per capita income for the county was $17,204.  About 8.20% of families and 11.60% of the population were below the poverty line, including 14.30% of those under age 18 and 8.80% of those age 65 or over.

2010 census
As of the 2010 United States census, there were 10,078 people, 4,571 households, and 2,884 families living in the county. The racial makeup of the county was 97.2% white, 0.8% American Indian, 0.3% black or African American, 0.2% Asian, 0.4% from other races, and 1.0% from two or more races. Those of Hispanic or Latino origin made up 1.9% of the population. In terms of ancestry, 32.3% were German, 16.2% were Irish, 14.5% were English, 12.6% were American, and 6.6% were Norwegian.

Of the 4,571 households, 23.6% had children under the age of 18 living with them, 53.4% were married couples living together, 6.1% had a female householder with no husband present, 36.9% were non-families, and 31.2% of all households were made up of individuals. The average household size was 2.19 and the average family size was 2.74. The median age was 48.1 years.

The median income for a household in the county was $49,010 and the median income for a family was $59,823. Males had a median income of $41,241 versus $26,150 for females. The per capita income for the county was $24,983. About 8.1% of families and 12.2% of the population were below the poverty line, including 14.1% of those under age 18 and 11.1% of those age 65 or over.

Economy
During the early history of Carbon County, coal mining was the predominant industry. The current economy relies on agriculture, recreation, and tourism.

In 2009 the top employers were Beartooth Hospital & Health Center, Red Lodge Mountain, and the Red Lodge Pizza Company.

In December 2014, construction began on a large windfarm, Mud Springs Wind Ranch, with 120 wind turbines, 12 miles (19 km) southeast of Bridger.

Communities

City
 Red Lodge (county seat)

Towns

 Bearcreek
 Bridger
 Fromberg
 Joliet

Census-designated places

 Belfry
 Boyd
 Edgar
 Fox
 Luther (originally Linley)
 Montaqua
 Roberts
 Rockvale
 Roscoe (originally Morris)
 Silesia

Unincorporated communities

 Alpine
 Bowler
 George Place
 Peterson Place
 Richel Lodge
 Selmes
 Warren
 Washoe

Former communities

 Carbonado
 Chance
 Chickentown
 Fairbanks
 Gebo (originally Coalville)
 Golden
 International
 New Caledonia
 Riverview
 Scotch Coulee
 Stringtown

See also
 List of lakes in Carbon County, Montana
 List of mountains in Carbon County, Montana
 National Register of Historic Places listings in Carbon County, Montana

References

External links
 County government website
 Homepage of the Carbon County News
 Carbon County Sheriff's Office

 
Billings metropolitan area
1895 establishments in Montana
Populated places established in 1895